Ruppertskirchen may refer to the following villages in Bavaria:

 Ruppertskirchen (Altomünster) in the municipality of Altomünster in the Upper Bavarian county of Dachau
 Ruppertskirchen (Arnstorf) in the municipality of Arnstorf, in the Lower Bavarian county of Rottal-Inn